Thorbjørn Holst Rasmussen (born 21 March 1987 in Silkeborg) is a former Danish footballer who played as a defender.

External links

References

1987 births
Living people
Danish men's footballers
Danish Superliga players
Silkeborg IF players
People from Silkeborg
Association football defenders
Sportspeople from the Central Denmark Region